Varuni Amunugama Fernando  is a Sri Lankan businesswoman and a prominent figure in the country’s advertising industry. She founded Triad Advertising (Pvt) Limited and the national TV channel Derana.

Her father is Sarath Amunugama, a former civil servant and current senior minister in the Sri Lankan government. She was educated at Sirimavo Bandaranaike Vidyalaya, C.M.S. Ladies' College, Colombo, and the British School of Paris, and was gained entrance to the Faculty of Law, University of Colombo. She partnered with Dilith Jayaweera, who she met at university to form Triad Advertising in 1993.

Fernando is linked to Dinesh Palipana, Queensland's first quadriplegic intern. Palipana has credited Fernando with helping him progress through the accident that left him a quadriplegic.

References

External links 
  Official Website of Triad

Sinhalese businesspeople
Sinhalese lawyers
Living people
Alumni of Ladies' College, Colombo
Alumni of the University of Colombo
Year of birth missing (living people)